Mezcal, sometimes spelled mescal, is a distilled alcoholic beverage made from any type of agave. Traditionally the word "mezcal" has been used generally in Mexico for all agave spirits and it continues to be used for many agave spirits whether these spirits have been legally certified as "mezcal" or not, and it is also considered a drink of artisan origin.

Agaves or magueys are endemic to the Americas and found globally as ornamental plants. More than 70% of mezcal is made in the Mexican state of Oaxaca, but is now produced and commercialized throughout Mexico for the national and international market. A saying attributed to Oaxaca regarding the drink is: "" ("For all bad, mezcal, and for all good, as well; and if there is no remedy, liter and a half"). Native fermented drinks from maguey plant, such as pulque, existed before the arrival of the Spanish.

The origin of mezcal is tied to the introduction of distillation technology  from Spanish immigrants to Nueva Galicia (present-day Aguascalientes, Colima, Guanajuato, Jalisco, Nayarit, and Zacatecas) in the late 16th century.

Upon introduction, these liquors were called aguardiente ('blazing water'). The Spanish had known distillation processes since the eighth century and had been used to drinking hard liquor. They brought a supply with them from Europe, but when this ran out, they began to look for a substitute. They had been introduced to pulque and other drinks based on the agave or agave plant, so they began experimenting to find a way to make a product with a higher alcohol content. The result is mezcal.

Their stills  were acquired and adapted by indigenous peoples in the region to produce mezcal from the fermented juices of agave heart. Vino faced severe prohibition from colonial authorities since the early 17th century because they competed with liquor imports from Spain. The ban of vino created the ideal circumstances for the commercialization and expansion of mezcal production. Mezcal also became banned shortly after. But they continued to be manufactured clandestinely in remote hard-to-reach areas because they were sourced from readily available wild agave plants and the stills were portable and easy to hide. Mezcal production gradually spread from the coastal regions to the highlands of Jalisco and neighboring regions in the 17th and 18th centuries. A variant from these regions made specifically from the blue agave became the tequila. It spread further to the rest of Mexico and parts of what is now the southern United States via trade routes.

In Mexico, mezcal is generally consumed straight and has a strong smoky flavor. Though other types of mezcal are not as popular as tequila, Mexico does export the product, mostly to Japan and the United States, and exports are growing.

Despite the similar name, mezcal does not contain mescaline or other psychedelic substances.

History

The agave was one of the most sacred plants in pre-Spanish Mexico, and had a privileged position in religious rituals, mythology and the economy. Cooking of the "piña", or heart, of the agave and fermenting its juice was practiced. The origin of this drink has a myth. It is said that a lightning bolt struck an agave plant, cooking and opening it, releasing its juice. For this reason, the liquid is called the "elixir of the gods". 

While fermented drinks from agave (like pulque) is pre-colonial, the distillation of agave heart juice into mezcal was only introduced in the colonial era. The technology for distillation originated from early Spanish immigrants who arrived to the regions of Nueva Galicia (present-day Aguascalientes, Colima, Guanajuato, Jalisco, Nayarit, and Zacatecas). 

By the early 1600s, the Spanish colonial government and the Real Audiencia in Spain banned brandy and issued an order for the destruction of vineyards because it competed with the sales of imported spirits from Spain. Although this wasn't complied with completely, leaving Mexico behind with the oldest wineries in the Americas. The prohibition led to the expansion and commercialization of the production of mezcal to fill the local demand for cheap liquor. The first mention of distilled agave spirits in colonial records is from 1619, by the Spanish cleric Domingo Lázaro de Arregui. He mentions that the indigenous peoples in the coastal regions of the Sierra de Nayarit were distilling "mexcales". By 1638, the governor of Nueva Galicia also started to regulate the sale of mezcal. By 1643, there are records of mezcal and vino de coco being sold in Guadalajara.

The production of mezcal moved from the coastal river basins of the Río Grande de Santiago to the inland ravines by the early 1700s to evade the prohibition on spirits production, as well as to take advantage of the larger numbers of wild agave plants in the interiors. The plants used expanded to highland cultivars of Agave angustifolia, as well as Agave rhodacantha in Jalisco, and Agave hookeri in Michoacán. 

By the mid-1700s, the production of vino de coco had ceased completely due to the prohibition and the loss of coconut plantations. But mezcal liquor survived because they were sourced from abundant wild agaves. The production sites moved to even more remote and difficult-to-access areas in the foothills of the Volcán de Colima, the ravines of the Colima Valley, and in the Chamila Valley. During this period, the first clandestine distilleries in the highlands of Jalisco were also established in the valleys of Amatitán, Tequila, Magdalena, and El Arenal; whose mezcal variant made specifically from blue agave later became the tequila. 

The small size of the stills (consisting mostly of a tree trunk and two copper kettles) made it easy to disassemble and move while evading colonial authorities. The numerous well-like ancient graves cut into the rocks in the region were also coopted as fermentation basins for agave juice. The small size of the still also allowed distillers to produce agave liquor from a very small number of agave plants or even a single plant. These conditions led to the constant selection and vegetative propagation of wild agave plants with the best characteristics for agave liquor production, eventually resulting in the development of domesticated cultivars of agave. 

Travelers during the colonial period of Mexico frequently mention mezcal, usually with an admonition as to its potency. Alexander von Humboldt mentions it in his Political Treatise on the Kingdom of New Spain (1803), noting that a very strong version of mezcal was being manufactured clandestinely in the districts of Valladolid (Morelia), Mexico State, Durango and Nuevo León. He mistakenly observed that mezcal was obtained by distilling pulque, contributing to its myth and mystique. Spanish authorities, though, treated pulque and mezcal as separate products for regulatory purposes.

Edward S. Curtis described in his seminal work The North American Indian the preparation and consumption of mezcal by the Mescalero Apache Indians: "Another intoxicant, more effective than túlapai, is made from the mescal—not from the sap, according to the Mexican method, but from the cooked plant, which is placed in a heated pit and left until fermentation begins. It is then ground, mixed with water, roots added, and the whole boiled and set aside to complete fermentation. The Indians say its taste is sharp, like whiskey. A small quantity readily produces intoxication." This tradition has recently been revived in the Guadalupe Mountains National Park.

Regulation

Internationally, mezcal has been recognized as an Appellation of Origin (AO, DO) since 1994. There is also a Geographical Indication (GI), originally limited to the states of Oaxaca, Guerrero, Durango, San Luis Potosí, Puebla and Zacatecas. Similar products are made in Jalisco, Guanajuato, Michoacán, and Tamaulipas, but these have not been included in the mezcal DO.

Within Mexico, mezcal is regulated under Norma Oficial Mexicana (NOM) regulations, originally NOM-070-SCFI-1994 (in 1994), by the industry body Consejo Mexicano Regulador de la Calidad del Mezcal A.C. (COMERCAM, the Mexican Regulatory Council for Mezcal Quality). This regulation became law in 2003, and certification began in 2005.

The regulations have been controversial, not only from small artisanal producers for whom the cost of certification is prohibitive, but also from traditional producers outside the chosen GI states and those producers who believe that the term "mezcal" should not be owned by the state. Uncertified producers are prohibited from using the term "mezcal" on their products. Some producers and importers have responded by labeling their products as "destilados de agave" or "agave spirits", a category now recognized by the United States' TTB and in increasing use.

In Canada, products that are labelled, packaged, sold or advertised as Mezcal must be manufactured in Mexico as mezcal under the stipulated guidelines. However, Canadian laws also allow for local bottling and resale of imported mezcal, after its alcohol percentage has been adjusted with the addition of distilled or purified water.
Currently uncertified agave spirits labeled as "destilados de agave" or "agave spirits" can also be bottled in the United States.

Mezcal agave
The agave plant is part of the Agavaceae family, which has almost 200 species. The mezcal agave has very large, thick leaves with points at the ends. When it is mature, it forms a "piña" or heart in the center from which juice is extracted to convert into mezcal. It takes between seven and fifteen years for the plant to mature, depending on the species and whether it is cultivated or wild. Agave fields are a common sight in the semi-desert areas of Oaxaca state and other parts of Mexico.

Varieties 
Mezcal is made from over 30 agave species, varieties, and subvarieties, in contrast with tequila, which is made only with blue agave. Of many agave species that can be used to make mezcal, seven are particularly notable. There is no exhaustive list, as the regulations allow any agaves, provided that they are not used as the primary material in other governmental Denominations of Origin. However, the interpretation of this regulation to mean that mezcal cannot be made from blue agave may be a mistranslation. The term silvestre "wild" is sometimes found, but simply means that the agaves are wild (foraged, not cultivated); it is not a separate variety.

Most commonly used is espadín "smallsword" (Agave angustifolia (Haw.), var. espadín), the predominant agave in Oaxaca. The next most important are arroqueño (Agave americana (L.) var. oaxacensis, sub-variety arroqueño), cirial (Agave karwinskii (Zucc.)), barril (Agave rodacantha (Zucc.) var. barril), mexicano (Agave macroacantha or Agave rhodacantha var. mexicano, also called dobadaan) and cincoañero (Agave canatala Roxb). The most famous wild agave is tobalá (Agave potatorum (Zucc.)). Others include madrecuixe, tepeztate, and jabalí. Various other varieties of Agave karwinskii are also used, such as bicuixe and madrecuixe.

Production

Traditionally, mezcal is handcrafted by small-scale producers. A village can contain dozens of production houses, called fábricas or palenques, each using methods that have been passed down from generation to generation, some using the same techniques practiced 200 years ago. This is an important difference with tequila which is nowadays mostly produced industrially.

The process begins by harvesting the plants, which can weigh  each, and extracting the piña, or heart, by cutting off the plant's leaves and roots. The piñas are then cooked for about three days, often in pit ovens, which are earthen mounds over pits of hot rocks. This underground roasting gives mezcal its intense and distinctive smoky flavor. They are then crushed and mashed (traditionally by a stone wheel turned by a horse) and then left to ferment in large vats or barrels with water added.

The mash is allowed to ferment, the resulting liquid collected and distilled in either clay or copper pots which will further modify the flavor of the final product. The distilled product is then bottled and sold. Unaged mezcal is referred to as joven, or young. Some of the distilled product is left to age in barrels between one month and four years, but some can be aged for as long as 12 years. Mezcal can reach an alcohol content of 55%. Like tequila, mezcal is distilled twice. The first distillation is known as ordinario, and comes out at around 75 proof (37.5% alcohol by volume). The liquid must then be distilled a second time to raise the alcohol percentage.

Mezcal is highly varied, depending on the species of agave used, the fruits and herbs added during fermentation and the distillation process employed, creating subtypes with names such as de gusano, tobalá, pechuga, blanco, minero, cedrón, de alacran, creme de café and more. A special recipe for a specific mezcal type known as pechuga uses cinnamon, apple, plums, cloves, and other spices that is then distilled through chicken, duck, or turkey breast. It is made when the specific fruits used in the recipe are available, usually during November or December. Other variations flavor the mash with cinnamon, pineapple slices, red bananas, and sugar, each imparting a particular character to the mezcal. Most mezcal, however, is left untouched, allowing the flavors of the agave used to come forward.

Not all bottles of mezcal contain a "worm" (actually the larva of a moth, Comadia redtenbacheri, that can infest agave plants), but if added, it is added during the bottling process. There are conflicting stories as to why such a thing would be added. Some state that it is a marketing ploy. Others state that it is there to prove that the mezcal is fit to drink, and still others state that the larva is there to impart flavor.

The two types of mezcal are those made of 100% agave and those mixed with other ingredients, with at least 80% agave. Both types have four categories. Joven (white) mezcal is clear and hardly aged. Dorado (golden) is not aged but a coloring agent is added. This is more often done with a mixed mezcal. Reposado or añejado (aged) is placed in wood barrels from two to nine months. This can be done with 100% agave or mixed mezcals. Añejo is aged in barrels for a minimum of 12 months. The best of this type are generally aged from 18 months to three years. If the añejo is of 100% agave, it is usually aged for about four years.

Mexico has about  cultivating agave for mezcal, owned by 9,000 producers. Over  are produced in Mexico annually, with more than 150 brand names.

The industry generates about 29,000 jobs directly and indirectly. To truly be called mezcal, the liquor must come from certain areas. States that have certified mezcal agave growing areas with production facilities are Durango, Guanajuato, Guerrero, Oaxaca, San Luis Potosí, Puebla, Michoacan, Tamaulipas, and Zacatecas. About 30 species of agave are certified for use in the production of mezcal. Oaxaca has 570 of the 625 mezcal production facilities in Mexico, but some in-demand mezcals come from Guerrero, as well. In Tamaulipas, 11 municipalities have received authorization to produce authentic mezcal with the hopes of competing for a piece of both the Mexican national and international markets. The agave used here is agave Americano, agave verde or maguey de la Sierra, which are native to the state.

Oaxaca produces 90% of the mezcal in Mexico, which presents a serious environmental threat to the state, according to local deputy Elena Cuevas Hernández. Water is used both for irrigation of the maguey plants and cooling the distilled product; wood is used to burn the stalks. Certain communities already control or prohibit cutting firewood. The deputy also warns of pollution related to inadequate disposal of rotting stalks left in the fields and pollutants with low pH (3 or 4) and methane (CH4). Yet another problem is the low pay that producers receive.

Drinking

In Mexico, mezcal is generally drunk straight, rather than mixed in a cocktail. Mezcal is generally not mixed with any other liquids, but is often accompanied with sliced oranges, lemon or lime sprinkled with a mixture of ground fried larvae, ground chili peppers, and salt called sal de gusano, which literally translates as "worm salt".

In the US, Europe and Japan, mezcal is increasingly becoming a prominent ingredient on many craft cocktail menus. Often mezcal is swapped for a more traditional spirit, in cocktails such as the "Oaxaca old fashioned" and the "Mezcal Negroni".

Exportation
In the 21st century, mezcal, especially from Oaxaca, has been exported. Exportation has been on the increase and government agencies have been helping smaller-scale producers obtain the equipment and techniques needed to produce higher quantities and qualities for export. The National Program of Certification of the Quality of Mezcal certifies places of origin for export products. Mezcal is sold in 27 countries on three continents. The two countries that import the most are the United States and Japan. In the United States, a number of entrepreneurs have teamed up with Mexican producers to sell their products in the country, by promoting its handcrafted quality, as well as the Oaxacan culture strongly associated with it.

The booming industry has been met with opposition from ecological activists, on 9 March San-Francisco based neozapatismo news outlet Radio Zapatista, released an article on the damage the industry and its mass-production is doing to the environment of the Mixteca Region and the cultures of the region.

Festival
The state of Oaxaca sponsors the International Mezcal Festival every year in the capital city, Oaxaca de Juárez. There, locals and tourists can sample and buy a large variety of mezcals made in the state. Mezcals from other states, such as Guerrero, Guanajuato, and Zacatecas also participate. This festival was started in 1997 to accompany the yearly Guelaguetza festival. In 2009, the festival had over 50,000 visitors, and brought in 4 million pesos to the economy.

See also 

Kahlúa
Mexican beer
Mexican cuisine
Mexican wine
Miske
Santiago Matatlán
Snake wine
Sotol
Tequila
Tiswin

Notes

References

Further reading
Bonello, Deborah and Jo Tuckman. "Mezcal: the mystical drink with its own culture and tradition – video". The Guardian. Sunday 17 August 2014.
Fox Latino: "Mexico's Traditional Spirit Mezcal Takes Over U.S. Bars" – slideshow
Mezcalistas: News about the agave spirits world and a database of mezcal brands

External links

Mezcales Tradicionales de los Pueblos de México A NGO which promotes historical practices and customs in the elaboration of Mezcal through informative degustations.
Mezcal brands sold in the United States 
Best Mezcals as Reported by Ratings Aggregator Proof66 
 Mezcal And Agave guide
 Agave Road Trip, a podcast that helps gringo bartenders better understand agave, agave spirits, and rural Mexico

Agave
Distilled drinks
Insects as food
Mexican Designation of Origin
Mexican distilled drinks
Oaxacan cuisine